The 1964 United States Senate election in Washington was held on November 3, 1964. Incumbent Democrat Henry M. Jackson won a third term in office with a landslide victory over Republican Superintendent of Instruction Lloyd J. Andrews.

Blanket primary

Candidates

Democratic
Alice Franklin Bryant
Arthur C. DeWitt
Henry M. Jackson, incumbent United States Senator since 1953

Republican
Lloyd J. Andrews, State Superintendent of Public Instruction
David J. Williams
Mary Elizabeth Whitner

Results

General election

Results

See also 
 1964 United States Senate elections

References

1964
Washington
United States Senate